National Socialist Party of Tripura is a political party in the Indian state of Tripura. NSPT was formed when Hirendra Tripura and others broke away from the Indigenous Nationalist Party of Tripura in the summer of 2003. One of the principal leaders of INPT, Shyamcharan Tripura, took the side of NSPT. With the help of the Communist Party of India (Marxist) (CPI(M)) members in the Tripura Tribal Areas Autonomous District Council (TTAADC), the NSPT were quickly able to win control over the TTAADC.

In the 2005 elections to the TTAADC the NSPT contested four seats, supported by the Left Front. All four candidates were elected.

In spite of the name, the party has no connection with Nazism or any other European use of the term "National Socialism".

See also
Tripuri nationalism
Tripura rebellion

References

Political parties in Tripura
Tripuri nationalism
2003 establishments in Tripura
Political parties established in 2003
Socialist parties in India
Indigenous People's Front of Tripura